Vancouver City was a federal electoral district in British Columbia, Canada, that was  represented in the House of Commons of Canada from 1904 to 1917.

This riding was created in 1903 from parts of Burrard riding. It was abolished in 1914 when it was redistributed into Burrard, Vancouver Centre and Vancouver South ridings.

Members of Parliament

Election results

See also 
 List of Canadian federal electoral districts
 Past Canadian electoral districts

External links 
Riding history from the Library of Parliament
 Website of the Parliament of Canada

Former federal electoral districts of British Columbia